Ak Hafiy Tajuddin Rositi (born 4 July 1991) is a Bruneian runner.

Rositi was born in Bandar Seri Begawan, the fifth of ten children.  He competed at the 2012 Summer Olympics in the 400 m event and he was defeated in the first round although he finished in his personal best time of 48.67.

Doping 
Ak Hafiy Tajuddin Rositi tested positive for doping at the 2013 Southeast Asian Games and was banned for 2 years. The sanction ended 24 December 2015.

References 

Living people
1991 births
Bruneian male sprinters
Doping cases in athletics
Bruneian sportspeople in doping cases
Olympic athletes of Brunei
Athletes (track and field) at the 2012 Summer Olympics
World Athletics Championships athletes for Brunei